Travis E. Huxman is an American plant physiological ecologist.

Early life and education
Huxman completed his Bachelor of Science and Master's degree from the California State University, San Bernardino and his PhD in biological science at the University of Nevada, Las Vegas.

Career

University of Arizona
Following his postdoctoral research position at the University of Colorado, Boulder, Huxman became an assistant professor at the University of Arizona. Upon joining the faculty, he earned funding for his project "Development of Riparian Evapotranspiration and Ecohydrologic Models to Predict Changes in and Consequences of Riparian Water Availability." During his tenure at the University of Arizona, he led their efforts to acquire ownership of Biosphere 2 and transform it into a laboratory for scientific research. He was later appointed the director of Biosphere 2 and co-director of the Arizona Center for STEM teachers. In these roles, he also co-authored a journal article calling for greater recognition of the role of humans in causing and exacerbating water scarcity.

University of California, Irvine
Huxman left the University of Arizona in 2012 to become a professor in the department of ecology and evolutionary biology and director of the Center for Environmental Biology at the University of California, Irvine (UCI). Following this, he was elected a Fellow of the Ecological Society of America for "advancing our understanding of plant ecophysiology, with fundamental work on the ecology and evolution of functional traits in plants, the effects of climate change on ecosystems, and the factors influencing restoration and conservation." As the director of the UCI Sustainability Initiative, the Center for Environmental Biology, and the Steele/Burnand Anza-Borrego Desert Research Center, Huxman was also awarded the Outstanding University Service award.

In 2020, Huxman was also elected a fellow of the American Association for the Advancement of Science for "distinguished contributions to the field of physiological plant ecology, particularly functional trait evolution and influence in ecosystems under global change."

Personal life
Huxman and his wife Kim have two daughters together.

References

External links

Living people
California State University, San Bernardino alumni
University of Nevada, Las Vegas alumni
University of Arizona faculty
University of California, Irvine faculty
Fellows of the Ecological Society of America
Fellows of the American Association for the Advancement of Science
Year of birth missing (living people)